The Peugeot BB1 was a fully electric concept city car that was introduced by Peugeot at the 2009 Frankfurt Motor Show.

References

External links 

 Official site: Peugeot BB1

Electric concept cars
Electric city cars
Hatchbacks
BB1
Vehicles with wheel motors